"Attentat" is a song by French singer Imen Es, released on November 23, 2018 as her debut, non-album single.

Music video
As of October 2022, the music video for Attentat had over 68 million views on YouTube.

Charts

Certifications

References

2018 songs
2018 singles
2018 debut singles